Leon Lissek (19 January 1939 – 13 January 2022) was an Australian-born British actor. 

He appeared in over 80 films in his career, which started with Marat/Sade, his film roles include Time Bandits, The Unbearable Lightness of Being, Nicholas and Alexandra, and The Horsemen.

Lissek was also well known for his small screen roles in the TV drama series The Sullivans and EastEnders.

Biography
Lissek was born in Australia on 19 January 1939. He started acting at the Kadimah in Melbourne, through his school-days and during his university year (he gave up the law course at Melbourne University about half-way through), when he was part of the Marlowe Society in late 1950s. He went to live in England in 1963.

Lissek played Hans Kauffman on The Sullivans. He also performed on stage. A review of Company, which played in Exeter in 1980, said Lissek was "admirably cast". Lissek, who was Jewish, spoke in defence of performing The Merchant of Venice, which is regarded by some as anti-Semitic.

Personal life
His wife, Heather Canning, was an actress. They married in 1969; she died in 1996. Lissek's death was announced by the entertainment union Equity in June 2022; he had died in January aged 82.

Selected TV and filmography
Marat/Sade (1967) as Lavoisier
Journey to the Unknown (1968) as Matakitas
Tell Me Lies (1968) as Guest
Special Branch (1970) as Hoffman
The Last Valley (1970) as Czeraki
Countess Dracula (1971) as Sergeant of Bailiffs
The Horsemen (1971) as Chikana Proprietor
Nicholas and Alexandra (1971) as Avdeyev
The Sullivans (1976) as Hans Kaufman
Sweeney 2 (1978) as Cardona Alexandros
The Famous Five (1978) as Hunchy
The Professionals (1978), one episode- Where The Jungle Ends as Pole
Shogun (1980) as Father Sebastio
Time Bandits (1981) as 1st Refugee
The Island of Adventure (1982) as Jo
Ever Decreasing Circles (1984) Christmas special- The Party as Mr.X
Eleni (1985) as Antoni
Personal Services (1987) as Mr. Popozogolou
Noble House (1988) as Christian Toxe
Whoops Apocalypse (1988) as Politburo Member
The Unbearable Lightness of Being (1988) as Bald Man in Bar
Bloodmoon (1990) as Myles Sheffield
The Trial (1993) as Stairman
Nostradamus (1994) as Inquisitor
EastEnders (1998) as Bruno di Marco
Suzie Gold (2004) as Julius

References

External links

Page with birthyear
BFI Filmography

1939 births
2022 deaths
20th-century Australian male actors
21st-century Australian male actors
Australian emigrants to the United Kingdom
Australian male film actors
Australian male television actors